Sara Craig is a Canadian singer-songwriter.

Craig launched her career in 1987 by placing a classified ad in Toronto's NOW looking for musicians to work with. She released her debut EP in 1991, and quickly became popular in Canadian alternative and indie circles. She followed up with her major label debut, Sweet Exhaust, on Attic Records in 1994. Her follow-up, Miss Rocket also on Attic Records, came in 1997. It was produced by Chris Tsangarides at the Metropolis Studios in London.

She was nominated for Best New Solo Artist – Juno Awards (1995).

Discography

 Sara Craig EP (1991)
 Sweet Exhaust (1994)
 Miss Rocket (1997)

References 

Canadian women rock singers
Canadian singer-songwriters
Living people
Musicians from Toronto
Year of birth missing (living people)
20th-century Canadian women singers